Ali al-Husayni al-Sistani (born 4 August 1930), commonly known as Ayatollah Sistani, is an Iranian–Iraqi Twelver Shia Ayatollah and marja'. He has been described as the spiritual leader of Shia Muslims worldwide, and one of the most senior scholars in Shia Islam. He has been included in all editions of "The Muslim 500: The World's Most Influential Muslims" mostly in the top ten positions since 2009. Sistani ranks ninth in 2023. Time magazine named him one of the 100 most influential people in the world in 2004 and 2005.

Biography

Early life
Sistani was born in either 1929 or 1930 in Mashhad, to a family of religious clerics who claim descent from Husayn ibn Ali, the grandson of Muhammad. His father was Mohammad-Baqir al-Sistani and his mother was the daughter of Ridha al-Mehrebani al-Sarabi.

Sistani began his religious education as a child, first in Mashhad in his father's hawzah, and continuing later in Qom. In Qom he studied under Grand Ayatollah Hossein Borujerdi. Later in 1951, Sistani traveled to Iraq to study in Najaf under Grand Ayatollah Abu al-Qasim al-Khoei. Sistani rose to the rank of mujtahid in 1960, at the age of thirty-one.

Grand Ayatollah

When Khoei died in 1992, Abd al-A'la al-Sabziwari briefly became the leading marja'. However, when he died in 1993, al-Sistani ascended to the rank of Grand Ayatollah through traditional peer recognition of his scholarship. His role as successor to Khoei was symbolically cemented when he led funeral prayers for Khoei, and he also inherited most of Khoei's network and following.

Baath Party
During the years of Saddam Hussein's rule of Iraq through the Baath Party, al-Sistani was untouched during the violent Baathist repression and persecution that killed many clerics including Mohammad al-Sadr in 1999, for which Saddam denied any involvement. Al-Sistani's mosque was forcefully shut down in 1994 and did not reopen until the 2003 US-led invasion of Iraq.

Role in contemporary Iraq
Since the overthrow of the Baath Party, Sistani has played an increasingly prominent role in regional religious and political affairs and he has been called the "most influential" figure in post-invasion Iraq.

Shortly after the US invasion began, Sistani issued a fatwa advising Shia clergy to become engaged in politics in order to better guide the Iraqi people toward "clearer decisions," and to fight "media propaganda." As the summer of 2003 approached, Sistani and his followers began to petition the occupying forces for a constitutional convention. Later, Sistani called for a democratic vote of the people for the purpose of forming a transitional government. Observers described the move as being a path leading directly to Shia political dominance over Iraq's government, as Shia Muslims make up approximately 65% of the total Iraqi population. Subsequently, Sistani criticized plans for an Iraqi government for not being democratic enough.

In early August 2004, Sistani experienced serious health complications related to a previously diagnosed heart condition. He traveled to London to receive medical treatment. It was, reportedly, the first time that Sistani had left Iraq in decades, and may have been due, in part, to growing concerns for his safety from sectarian violence. Though still recovering, Sistani returned later in the month to broker a military truce at the Imam Ali Mosque in Najaf where Muqtada al-Sadr and the Mahdi Army had been cornered by American and Iraqi forces. Sadr, who rose rapidly to prominence through a series of independent military actions beginning in 2004, has since actively challenged Sistani's more progressive influence over Shia in the region.

Sistani's edicts reportedly provided many Iraqi Shia cause for participating in the January 2005 elections—he urged, in a statement on October 1, 2004, that Iraqis recognize the election as an "important matter," additionally, Sistani asked that the elections be "free and fair ... with the participation of all Iraqis." Soon after, al-Sistani issued a fatwa alerting Shia women that they were religiously obligated to participate in the election, even if their husbands had forbidden them from voting. In an issued statement Sistani remarked that, "truly, women who go forth to the polling centers on election day are like Zaynab, who went forth to Karbala."

He has consistently urged the Iraqi Shia not to respond in kind to attacks from Sunni Salafists, which have become common in Sunni-dominated regions of Iraq like the area known as the "Triangle of Death," south of Baghdad. Even after the destruction of the Shia Al-Askari Mosque in Samarra in February 2006, his network of clerics and preachers continued to urge calm and told their followers that "it was not their Sunni neighbors who were killing them but foreign Wahhabis." Sistani's call for unity after the bombing of the mosque helped to control a potentially dangerous situation, preventing the country to enter in a bloody sectarian war. Sistani did the same when the same mosque was bombed again in 2007.

An alleged plot to assassinate Sistani was foiled on January 29, 2007, when three Jund al-Samaa gunmen were captured at a hotel near his office. It is believed to have been part of a larger attack against a number of targets in Najaf.

In an online open poll, 2005, Ali al-Sistani was selected as the 30th topmost intellectual person in the world on the list of Top 100 Public Intellectuals by Prospect (UK) and Foreign Policy (US).

On 13 June 2014 Sistani appealed that Iraqis should support the government against the Islamic State of Iraq and the Levant militant group which had taken over Mosul and Tikrit and was threatening Baghdad. Later in June 2014, Sistani revised his statement and issued a fatwa calling for "citizens to defend the country, its people, the honor of its citizens, and its sacred places," against the ISIL.

Sistani said the Iraqi government and police were liable for the killing of protestors during the 2019–2021 Iraqi protests. He requested that the government prosecute those who gave the command to shoot protesters. The ayatollah rarely voices his opinion on politics except in extreme unrest. The protests have been described as Iraq's worst violence since ISIL was militarily defeated in 2017. A month later in November 2019, in response to the death of three Iraqi protesters, Sistani said "No person or group, no side with a particular view, no regional or international actor may seize the will of the Iraqi people and impose its will on them."

Shia patronage
As the leading cleric in Najaf, Sistani oversees sums amounting to millions of US dollars. His followers offer him a fixed part of their earnings (khums), which is used for educational and charitable purposes. Sistani's office has reported that it supports 35,000 students in Qom, 10,000 in Mashhad, and 4,000 in Isfahan. It also oversees a network of representatives (wakil) "who promote his views in large and small ways in neighborhoods, mosques, bazaars, and seminaries from Kirkuk to Basra."

In Iran, as a result of the post-invasion opening of the Iraqi cities of Najaf and Karbala to Iranians, many Iranians are said to return from pilgrimage in Iraq as supporters of Sistani.

Ayatollah Sistani sent nearly 1,000 aid packages, mostly food, but also other basic needs, to Balkhab, Afghanistan during the Balkhab uprising to help out the displaced Hazaras.

Criticism and controversy

Al Jazeera
In May 2007, hundreds of Shias demonstrated publicly in Basra and Najaf to protest comments made by television presenter and journalist Ahmed Mansour during a Qatari broadcast of Al Jazeera television programming. While presenting Bela Hodod (a.k.a. Without Borders), Mansour voiced skepticism of al-Sistani's leadership credentials while directing questions about the Iraqi-born cleric to his guest, Shia cleric Jawad al-Khalsi. Mansour also suggested that al-Sistani was not aware of contemporary problems in Iraq or of prevailing post-war conditions, and he alleged that Sistani's edicts were, largely, written and disseminated by aides. At another point, Mansour asked Khalsi whether the United States was using Iraqi politicians, and also al-Sistani, to promote Western interests in Iraq.

Saudi scholar
In January 2010, during a Jumu'ah khutba (Friday sermon), Saudi scholar Mohamad al-Arefe vehemently criticized al-Sistani by referring to him as an atheist and by describing his behavior as "debauched". The remarks prompted protest by his followers in Iraq, Qom and Lebanon. Iraqi Prime Minister Nouri al-Maliki rebuked the Saudi religious authorities. Lebanon-based Islamist militant organization Hezbollah also condemned the attack on al-Sistani, calling the speech "inauspicious," while praising al-Sistani as one of Shia Islam's "most prominent religious references."

Guardianship of Islamic Jurists (Wilayat al-Faqih)
Like his predecessor Khoei, Sistani has not wholly embraced the post-Age-of-Occultation theory known as the Guardianship of the Islamic Jurists, which was espoused and supported by the late Iranian Grand Ayatollah Ruhollah Khomeini and which is currently extant and enforced by the Iranian government through its own constitution and by its supreme leader and highest religious authority Ali Khamenei. Sistani's scholarly views regarding guardianship resembles Khoei's views, but differs in several respects. Additionally, the primary difference between Sistani's interpretation and the interpretation of Khomeini and Khamenei is reportedly in the range of power that a Grand Ayatollah has in ruling the Islamic community. Sistani has publicly stated and maintained that his interpretation of the doctrine is one that grants more power to the Ayatollahs than al-Khoei, but less than either Khoemeini or Khamenei:

On the specific question of obedience to a supreme leader, Sistani has said that any pronouncement given by a supreme leader "supersedes all, (including those given by other Maraji') unless the pronouncements are proven to be wrong or the pronouncements are proven to be against what is in the Qur'an or in Religious Tradition."

Additionally, instead of advocating for the rule by Islamic clerics Sistani is said to favor a more relaxed perspective related to the provision of values and guidelines for social order (nizam al-mujama) as being the recognized, primary role of Islam.

Also, according to Sadegh Zibakalam, professor of political science at Tehran University, al-Sistani has consistently avoided supporting a strict interpretation of the theory, especially of absolute guardianship, nor has he explicitly offered any substantive affirmation of the theory as a whole (including limited guardianship); thereby creating "a major lacuna" in the "grand ideological scenario" of the Islamic Republic of Iran.

According to scholar Vali Nasr, despite Sistani's disagreements with Iran's ruling clerics, he has "never tried to promote a rivalry" between his religious center of Najaf and the Iranian center in Qom, and has never made any comments about the confrontations between reformists and conservatives in Qom or between clerics in Lebanon, a reflection, Nasr believes, of Sistani's reluctance to become involved in politics.

Works

Works translated into English
 Current Legal Issues
 A Code of practice for Muslims in the West
 Hajj Rituals
 Islamic Laws
 Jurisprudence Made Easy
 Contemporary Legal Rulings in Shia Law

Non-English
His office states that thirty-two other works exist, but have not been translated into English.

Internet
By working with Shia computer programmers and other specialists, al-Sistani sponsored the establishment of The Ahlulbayt (a.s.) Global Information Center, an international web-resource, and he has since been called "the electronic grand ayatollah par excellence."

Cyber attacks
On 18 September 2008, hackers attacked hundreds of Shia websites. The attacks were reportedly the work of a Muslim faction known as group-xp, based in the Arabian peninsula and linked to Salafi and Wahhabi movements. They attacked an estimated three hundred Shia internet websites including The Ahlulbayt (a.s.) Global Information Center. It was later dubbed the "largest Wahhabi hacker attack" in recent years.

After the attack, visitors to the site were greeted by a red attack banner bearing the slogan "group-xp" paired with a message in Arabic denouncing Shia beliefs and officials. Hackers also replaced a video of Sistani with one of comedian Bill Maher mocking Sistani.

However, the attack led to the retaliatory hacking of more than nine hundred Wahhabi and Salafi websites. One such successful attack was documented on video and uploaded to YouTube on 3 October 2008. The hacker, a Shia from the United Arab Emirates using the handle "ShiaZone", was shown logging into email accounts of suspected members of group-xp. The hacked email accounts reportedly yielded group-xp's contact information, information that was subsequently posted on Shia websites.

Public appearances
al-Sistani has notoriously avoided public appearances, despite his widespread fame and not shying away from attention. In practice, al-Sistani never delivers public sermons or speeches, and only releases official statements through "official representatives". The statements are later transcribed and posted on Sistani's official webpage, with the Grand Ayatollah's official stamp, indicating the authenticity of the remarks. Though al-Sistani has appeared in a few short videos, he does not say anything in these videos and is usually motionless. The only known public recording of Sistani's voice is a short, Persian-language lecture by al-Sistani to students. Another video depicts al-Sistani in the back of a room conversing with a fellow cleric, again in Persian, and faintly captures sparse bits of Sistani's vocalizations.

Sheikh Abdul-Mahdi Al-Karbalai is Sistani's foremost representative and gives speeches in Sistani's stead. Abdul-Mahdi Al-Karbalai is noted for having announced Sistani's famous fatwa (edict) obligating Iraqis to vote, and with the rise of terrorism, to join the military to oppose ISIS.

Meeting with Pope Francis 
Pope Francis and Grand Ayatollah Ali al-Sistani met on 6 March 2021 during Pope Francis's visit to Iraq. They met for about 40 minutes in the Shiite cleric's home in Najaf. The visit was prepared with great care to details, including how many meters the Pope would walk to al-Sistani's home and where the two would sit.

Personal life
Al-Sistani is married to the daughter of Muhammad-Hassan al-Shirazi (d. 1972), the grandson of Mirza Shirazi. He has two sons, Muhammad-Ridha and Muhammad-Baqir.

See also
Muhammad Kazim Khurasani
Mirza Husayn Tehrani
Abdallah Mazandarani
Mirza Ali Aqa Tabrizi
Mirza Sayyed Mohammad Tabatabai
Seyyed Abdollah Behbahani

References

External links

 Official Website (English, French, Urdu, فارسي, Türkçe, عربي)

1930 births
Living people
People from Mashhad
Iranian Shia clerics
Iranian emigrants to Iraq
Iraqi grand ayatollahs
Islamic democracy activists
20th-century Iranian people
20th-century Iraqi people
20th-century Islamic religious leaders
21st-century Iranian people
21st-century Iraqi people
21st-century Islamic religious leaders